Pullea is a genus of trees of the family Cunoniaceae, with species found growing naturally in New Guinea, Fiji and the wet tropical rainforests of north eastern Queensland, Australia.

Species include: 
 Pullea glabra 
 Pullea mollis 
 Pullea perryana  – (Fiji endemic)
 Pullea stutzeri  – (Queensland wet tropical rainforests endemic, Australia)

References

 Australian Plant Name Index (APNI): Pullea
 Missouri Botanical Gardens - VAST (VAScular Tropicos) nomenclatural database

 
Oxalidales genera